Koodevide  is an Indian Malayalam television romantic drama thriller series that premiered on 4 January 2021 and airs on Malayalam General Entertainment Channel Asianet and also available on the digital platform Disney+ Hotstar. The show is produced by Movie Mill of Krishnan Sethukumar, and stars Bipin Jose, Anshitha, Krishna Kumar (later replaced by Anil Mohan), and Sreedhanya in the leads. It is an official remake of Bengali series Mohor.

Synopsis
Soorya, a talented and family-oriented girl, sets out to prove her mettle and support her family after her father faces losses in his business. She meets Rishikesh "Rishi", an arrogant misogynist.

Plot
inRishikesh "Rishi" is a modern-day misogynist who feels that women are not allowed to be independent. The reason for his condition is because his mother unwillingly left him at a young age, to take care of her elderly parents. Rishi was raised by his paternal aunt Rani, a cruel and cunning woman who hates Rishi's mother. While Soorya Kaimal, is a determined and headstrong girl, who wishes to make a mark on the society and feels that women must be independent.

Soorya comes from a middle-class family, her father, Shivaram, who was once a businessman, had gone bankrupt. Soorya has no desire to marry, as she wants to learn and pursue higher jobs so that she can help her family. Her mother, Devamma and elder sister Arya supports Soorya. Arya was married to a cruel man named Mohan, who wishes to inherit wealth from the Kaimal family. Her father wants her to marry.

Shocked, Soorya escapes from the marriage hall, and take shelter in her teacher, Aditi's house. Aditi becomes Soorya's mentor. Aditi is none other than Rishi's mother who left him at a young age. She regrets her mistake and wants to reconcile with her son. Meanwhile, Rishi is engaged to a beautiful and wealthy girl named Mithra. However, Mithra is unready to marry and goes to US to pursue higher studies.

A goon named, Basavanna attacks Aditi and she is taken to the hospital. Soorya and Aditi's estranged husband, Aditya is much worried about her condition. Aditya's sister in law, Lakshmi asks Rishi to meet a hospitalized Aditi. However, Rishi is reluctant as he hates Aditi for leaving him. However, hesitant, Rishi meets Aditi. It is shown that Rishi is not a bad person, feeling sorry about his mother Rishi sees her. However, Rani who learns of this, confront Aditi. Rishi overhears their conversation and once again hates her. Recovered, Aditi manages to gain admission for Soorya in Adi Keshava college with the help of Aditya. Rishi bombards Soorya with questions but she wins the interview.

However, as the college starts the students take instant dislike towards Soorya and mistreat her. Especially, Neetu and Neema, who are Rishi's spoilt cousin sisters. One day, while writing a scholarship exam, Rani decides to plot against Soorya, she asks her nieces Neetu and Neema for help. Eventually, they falsely accuse Soorya of cheating. However, Rishi gives her a last chance. Soorya plans to leave the college unable to bear the humiliation. Rishi convinces her not to.

Soon, Rishi starts to feel jealous of the closeness between SP Sooraj and Soorya. Soon, Rishi falls for Soorya. He tries to help her everytime but Soorya feels that Rishi is using her to gain fame for the college. However, she too falls for Rishi. Unfortunately, Mithra makes a re-entry to disrupt Soorya and Rishi's closeness.

Rishi is always hostile towards Mithra. Meanwhile, Shivaram lied to Soorya, Arya, Shekar and Devamma that he is working in a good company as the assistant of its owner. However, Devamma and Arya discovers that Shivaram was lying to them after Devamma finds a security uniform in Shivaram's cupboard. Shivaram reveals that he works as the security of the company godown.

Arya is shattered, knowing the truth. Fortunately, Aditi calls Arya to send her qualifications so that she can find a job. Successfully, Aditi consults her best friend, Ramadevi "Rama". Rama is the head of the same company in which Shivaram works. Shivaram learns that Soorya and Aditi are coming to his company, fearing, his truth will be revealed, he hides from them. While, Rama is fascinated by Arya's qualifications and agrees to provide her a job.

However, things turn bitter, when Sabu, a goon comes to Soorya's house, while they were away. He collects Soorya and Aditi's number. In the past, Sabu had attempted to abduct Soorya but she was saved by Rishi. Sabu goes to Rishi's house and manipulates Rani against Rishi. Sabu manages to receive Rishi's number. Meanwhile, Shekar decides to sell his house to make both ends meet.

Meanwhile, Mithra is disappointed to see a sudden change in Rishi's behaviour. She tries her best to win his heart, but all in vain. Soon, Mithra, Rani, Anandan (Rani's brother), Kunjiraman "Kunji" (Rani's husband) starts to suspect if Rishi is attracted to Soorya. While, Aditi and Soorya are worried if Sabu would cause troubles to them and Rishi. Aditi contacts Aditya and asks him to alert Rishi of the problem.

Later, Devamma and Shivaram are celebrating their wedding anniversary. This time, Mohan makes a re-entry and acts as if he is a changed man. He buys gifts for Devamma and Shivaram and expensive clothes for Arya, so that Shekar can be jealous. Arya refuses to accept Mohan's gift. Later, when Arya gets a job, Mohan coerces her to come with him in the car so that he can drop her to the office.

Problems, keep arising when Rani and Sabu plots to ruin Soorya's life. They call upon Soorya's cruel ex-fiancé to take her away when the time comes. They also plot to perform Rishi and Mithra's marriage without Rishi's knowledge as Rishi don't want to wed Mithra. Rani and Kunji visit an astrologer to finalize Mithra and Rishi's wedding. The astrologer objects as Rishi and Mithra's kundlis don't match.

One day Soorya visits Sabu's grandmother on Sabu's request  however he tries to abduct Soorya and lock her up in a room. Rishi gets to know about Soorya's visit and rescues her from Sabu and gang and finally they reveal their feelings each other and fall in love in the rain . Meanwhile, Mohanan and house owner enters Shekaran's house and tries to harass Arya but Shekaran saves Arya and fatally injures Mohanan and they go from this house.

Arya and Shekar get married secretly. On Aditi's advice, Rishi and Soorya take shelter in Aditi's ancestral house, Aalanchery. There, they are warmly welcomed by Aditi's uncle, who is unaware that Rishi is Aditi's son. However, another problem starts when Aditi's cruel cousin, Jagannathan "Jagan" comes. Rani tries many ways to bring Rishi back home and Mithra vows to take revenge on Soorya for spoiling her life and she decides to act like a good person . Rani and jagan join hands to bring rishi back home  He tries to trouble Soorya and Rishi. Aditi's uncle reveals about how many hardships Aditi faced in her life because of Jagan and Rani. He also mentions that Rani had conspired against Aditi to take Rishi away from her. Rishi realises about how much Aditi loved for him. Rishi calls Aditi to invite her over Aalanchery to perform her father's Śrāddha. After Aditi's arrival, Rishi grows more close to her and realises her value. One day, as Jagan creates a commotion to inherit Aalanchery, Rishi stands up against him and supports Aditi. For the first time, he addresses Aditi as his mother in the public. Aditi is much overjoyed. As they are about to return, an unknown car causes an accident to them planned by jagan.Meanwhile, Devamma and Shivarama kaimal gets to know about mohanan's intentions and  furious kaimal goes berserk and thrashes mohanan in hospital.

Meanwhile, Rishi and soorya return to college however Mithra, Rani, Neethu and Hima plan to ruin soorya's life. The college announces exam and Mithra tries to reduce Soorya's score and give her low marks. Soorya believes she has got good marks and warns college staff that she will protest if her paper is not re-evaluated

Trouble brew up for soorya and Rishi when Jagan threatens Soorya and her parents  and Rani forbids Soorya  from meeting Adithi if she wants to marry Rishi. Jagan realizes that Rani cheated her.Rani then makes a plan to finish soorya along with Neethu and Hima by organizing a trip along with soorya ,Rishi and Mithra to a place called Thevermala a dangerous place. So they start for trip and reach at the place and start exploring but a stranger hired by Rani and Jagan follows them and Rishi notices the stranger and tries to confront him Neethu watches this and she decides to finish the task by pushing soorya down by organizing selfie. But unfortunately Mithra gets pushed by Neethu and Soorya tries to save  her but Mithra loses grip and falls down putting everyone shocked and sad state including Soorya Rishi and Mithra's parents.They reach her at the hospital and the police arrive to investigate the incident . Neethu gives false testimony against Soorya on the advice of Rani.Rishi gets to know this  and tries to help Soorya by escaping her with Adithi but Soorya gets arrested . These police officers working under rani  and jagan tried to harass Soorya but Rishi protects her by sitting for her whole night at police station .Sp sooraj saves them and lashes out at the officers. Then Soorya faces backlash from teachers by protesting that they will continue teaching if Soorya is suspended resulting in soorya's suspension.Will Soorya innocence be proved?

Cast

Lead cast
Anshitha Anji as Soorya Kaimal
Rani's daughter; Shivarama and Devamma's adoptive daughter and Arya's and Nithin's adoptive sister. Shekhar's cousin, Adhithi's student 
Bipin Jose as Rishikesh Adithyan aka Rishi
Adhithi and Adithyan's son, Soorya's teacher 
Krishnakumar / Anil Mohan as Adithyan
Rishi's father, Soorya's teacher. He is Adhithi's estranged husband who comes to meet her regularly. Anandan and Rani's brother
Sreedhanya as Adhithi Padmanabhan
Adithyan's estranged wife, Rishikesh's mother, Rani's sister-in-law and Soorya's mentor. She supports Soorya in her studies.

Recurring cast
Nisha Mathew as Rani
Soorya's mother; Adithya and Anandan's sister, Adhithi and Lakshmi's sister-in-law. Rishi, Neetu and Neema's aunt.
Kochunni Prakash as Komban Sekharan
Arya's love interest, Devamma and Shivarama's nephew, Soorya's cousin
Chilanka S Deedu as Arya
Devamma and Shivarama's eldest daughter, Soorya's and Nithin's elder sister, Shekhar's love interest, Mohanan's former wife.
Manve (Sruthy Surendran) as Mithra
Rishi's fiancé, Hema and Thampi's daughter.
Indulekha as Lakshmi
Anandan's wife, Neetu and Neema's mother, Adithya and Rani's sister-in-law. Rishi's aunt
Sudarsanan as Shivarama Kaimal
Soorya's adoptive father, Nithin and Arya's father, Devamma's husband.
Sindhu Varma as Devamma
Soorya's adoptive mother, Nithin and Arya's mother, Shivarama's wife
Santhosh K as Kunjiraman 
Rani's husband, Anandan and Aditya's brother-in-law, Aditi and Lakshmi's co-brother.
Devendranath as SP Sooraj IPS
Rishi's friend and he have crush on Soorya
Santhosh Sanjay as Roshan k. Roshan
Soorya's friend
Midhun as Nithin 
Soorya and Arya's brother, Devamma and Shivarama's only son.
Abees as Shivamohan Thampi
Mithra's father, Hema's husband
Archana as Aami
Nayana Josan as Neetu 
Anandan and Lakshmi's daughter, Neema's sister.
Shahina Siyad as Neema 
Neetu's sister, Lakshmi and Anandan's daughter, Rishi's cousin, Rani and Aditya's niece.
Ajith M Gopinath as Ananthan
Adithyan and Rani's brother, Lakshmi's husband, Aditi and Kunjiraman's brother-in-law.
Roshan Mathew John as Hema
Mithra's mother, Thampi's wife.
Raheena Anas as Kalki
Ravikrishnan Gopalakrishnan as Rajeev Chandra Balika
Stella Raj
Manjulan as Jagannathan
Ratheesh Sundar as Karippety Sabu
Sundara Pandian as Basavanna
Harisree Martin as CC Saileshkumar VP
Kochu Preman as Bhasi Pillai
Akhil S Prasad as Vivek
Renjusha Menon as Jyothilakshmi

Guest Appearance
V. Suresh Thampanoor as DJ Aristo Suresh
Avanthika Mohan as ASP Sreya Nandini IPS

Production

Casting
Malayalam actor Krishnakumar is making his comeback to Malayalam television after a Hiatus of 13 years, he has portrayed male lead in several TV series in early 2000s. Sreedhanya is making her serial acting debut with this series.

Adaptations

References

Malayalam-language television shows
Asianet (TV channel) original programming